John Stepan Zamecnik (May 14, 1872 in Cleveland, Ohio – June 13, 1953 in Los Angeles, California) was an American composer and conductor. He is best known for the "photoplay music" he composed for use during silent films by pianists, organists, and orchestras.

Zamecnik used many pseudonyms, including Dorothy Lee, Lionel Baxter, R.L. (Robert) Creighton, Arturo de Castro, "Josh and Ted", J. (Jane) Hathaway, Kathryn Hawthorne, Roberta Hudson, Ioane Kawelo, J. Edgar Lowell, Jules Reynard, F. (Frederick) Van Norman, Hal Vinton and Grant Wellesley.

Early life 
John Zamecnik was born in Cleveland to Czech immigrants Josef Zámečník (1832-1915) and Kateřina Hrubecká (1838-1908). Josef was born in Budičovice and Kateřina was born in the nearby Skály. The couple married in Heřmaň in 1862. Josef's brother Jan later married Kateřina's sister Konstancie in the same place in 1869. Both couples immigrated to Ohio bringing Josef's daughters and perhaps other relatives. Jan's grandson was the geneticist Paul Zamecnik.

Career 
Zamecnik studied at the Prague Conservatory of Music under Antonín Dvořák in the mid-1890s, completing his classes there in 1897.

In 1899 Zamecnik finally returned to the United States. While living in Cleveland, where he worked as a violinist and composer, he also played in the Pittsburgh Symphony Orchestra as a violinist under Victor Herbert. In 1907, Zamecnik became music director of the newly constructed Hippodrome Theater in Cleveland, Ohio. When the Hippodrome commenced with the screening of silent films, Zamecnik began to compose music scores for them. They were published by Samuel Fox, whose company was the first to publish original film scores in the United States. Fox published the Zamecnik-composed Sam Fox Moving Picture Music volumes, consisting of incidental music and leitmotifs such as "Mysterious Burglar Music", intended for when a burglar is on screen.

Jack Shaindlin, music director of Movietone News in New York City, adapted the first theme of Zamecnik's popular circus march World Events (1935) for the Main and End Title theme of Movietone Newsreels. Jackie Gleason's American Scene Magazine television series in the 1950s used this version to open a skit that parodied current events.

In 2011 Paramount Pictures secured the original manuscript score of the cues composed by Zamecnik for Wings from the Library of Congress. A new recording was produced for the 24 January 2012 launch of the Wings DVD and Blu-ray.

Later life and legacy

Zamecnik died in 1953.

His scores are held in the University of Southern California's Cinematic Arts Library.

Compositions

Works for orchestra

 1919 My Cairo Love, Egytische serenade
 1921 Somewhere In Naples
 Babylonian Nights
 China Doll Parade, for orchestra and organ
 I Gathered a Rose I gathered a Rose
 Treacherous Knave
 Wings

Works for band 

 1928 Scarlet Mask, overture
 1930 Olympia, overture
 1935 World Events, March
 1936 1776, overture
 1939 Fortuna, overture
  Indian Dawn, serenade
 Neapolitan Nights
 Southern Miniatures, suite

Vocal music
 1915 California - words: Adele Humphrey

Film
 1923 The Covered Wagon 
 1926 Old Ironsides - "Sons of the Sea"
 1927 Wings
 1927 The Rough Riders - "The Trumpet Calls"
 1928 Abie's Irish Rose
 1928 The Wedding March
 1929 Betrayal
 1929 Redskin
 1930 Bear Shooters
 1930 When the Wind Blows
 1931 Strictly Dishonorable
 1931 Pardon Us - Gaol Birds - Jailbirds
 1932 Wild Girl - Salomy Jane
 1932 Chandu the Magician
 1932 My Pal, the King
 1932 Igloo
 1932 Impatient Maiden
 1932 Looking on the Bright Side
 1933 The Worst Woman in Paris?
 1933 The Power and the Glory - "Power and Glory"
 1933 Paddy the Next Best Thing
 1933 Deluge
 1933 Shanghai Madness
 1933 The Man Who Dared
 1933 The Warrior's Husband
 1933 Zoo in Budapest
 1933 Dangerously Yours
 1933 Face in the Sky
 1933 Cavalcade
 1934 Dos más uno dos - "Two and One Two"
 1934 Baby Take a Bow
 1934 Midnight - "Call It Murder"
 1935 The Fighting Marines
 1935 The Adventures of Rex and Rinty
 1935 Our Little Girl
 1935 Charlie Chan in Egypt
 1937 SOS Coast Guard
 1937 Come On, Cowboys!
 1937 Riders of the Whistling Skull - "The Golden Trail"
 1938 The Terror of Tiny Town

Orchestra 
 1916 Nola, Felix Arndt (1889–1918)

Further reading
 Goldmark, Daniel, editor. (2013) Sounds for the Silents: Photoplay Music from the Days of Early Cinema. Dover Books, New York,

References

External links 
 Mont Alto: Composer Profile: J.S. Zamecnik (1872-1953)
 MIDI sequences of compositions for piano, including many by J. S. Zamecnik 
 vitals.rootsweb.ancestry.com
 
 

1872 births
1953 deaths
American film score composers
American male film score composers
American male conductors (music)
Prague Conservatory alumni
Musicians from Cleveland
20th-century American composers
20th-century American violinists
20th-century American conductors (music)
Classical musicians from Ohio
20th-century American male musicians
American people of Czech descent